Prisoner Without A Name, Cell Without A Number (Spanish: Preso Sin Nombre, Celda Sin Numero) is a 1981 memoir by the left-wing Argentine writer Jacobo Timerman.

About
In Tel Aviv, Timerman wrote and published Prisoner Without a Name, Cell Without a Number (1981), a memoir about his experience in Argentina, which also covered the larger political issues. The book gained instant international popularity. Timerman was invited to lecture about his experience in Israel, Europe, Canada, and the United States, which increased his international recognition and publicized the human rights situation in Argentina.

The book weaves together different narratives, discussing Timerman's imprisonment, his biography, and larger topics of Argentine politics. Prisoner Without a Name''' provided new details to the world about the Argentine military dictatorship. For instance, it described a weekly lecture called "The Academy" held for police and military officers, who were taught that they were fighting a "World War III" against left-wing terrorists. The book describes antisemitism and anti-intellectualism within the military regime. In 1983, it was made into a television film, Jacobo Timerman: Prisoner Without a Name, Cell Without a Number''.

See also
List of memoirs of political prisoners

References

1981 non-fiction books
Antisemitism in Argentina
Argentine autobiographies
Books about antisemitism
Books about Zionism
Jewish literature
Jews and Judaism in Argentina
Memoirs adapted into films
Memoirs of imprisonment
Zionism in South America